Andrew Onwubolu , (born 6 June 1989), better known by his stage name Rapman, is a British rapper, record producer, screenwriter and film director. He is known for dealing socially conscious themes, as well as his uniquely vivid style of storytelling through the medium of rap.

He made his debut with the Blue Story Trilogy (2013-2014), which he followed up with several charity music videos for SBTV including Hope (2015), Pay As You Go (2016) and Promise (2017). Rapman experienced international fame with his three-part YouTube trilogy Shiro's Story (2018), which gained a cult following among the music scene in the United Kingdom and led to his signing with Jay-Z's Roc Nation.

Rapman made his writing and directorial debut with Blue Story (2019), an adaptation of his YouTube series of the same name. His other film and TV credits include American Son, the remake of the 2009 French crime film A Prophet, and the Netflix superhero series Supacell.

In 2022, Rapman was appointed MBE in the 2022 Birthday Honours from Elizabeth II for services to drama and music, through his rapping and filmmaking.

Early and personal life
Onwubolu was born on June 6, 1989, in Deptford, London. He was raised by his mother and from age 11 attended Sacred Heart Catholic School, Camberwell, in the midst of a postcode war between Deptford and Peckham. Onwubolu is a father of three children with a former partner.

Music career
Rapman made his debut with the Blue Story Trilogy (2013-2014), which depicted two best friends from different areas of London (Peckham and Deptford) who find themselves becoming enemies in a violent and insidious postcode war between their respective areas. The series was released on the YouTube channel SBTV and gained positive feedback.

Following the success of Blue Story, Rapman released began collaborating with SBTV founder Jamal Edwards on several charity music videos for the channel including Hope (2015), which dealt with blood donors, Rollercoaster (2016) which dealt with suicide, Pay As You Go (also 2016), which dealt with unemployed fathers, and Promise (2017), which dealt with domestic abuse.

Film career

Shiro's Story
In 2018, Rapman created wrote, directed and produced the three-part YouTube musical crime drama series Shiro's Story, which told about a young black man from London who enters a violent life of crime after he learns that his girlfriend's daughter is actually his best friend's. The series was inspired by a true story that Rapman heard from friends in Lewisham about a man whose daughter was actually his friend's.

Starring Joivan Wade, Percelle Ascott and Rita Bernard-Shaw, alongside rappers Konan, Deno, Ashley Walters, Headie One, Not3s and Cadet, the series was shot guerrilla-style on a budget of £3,000 and had been seen 7.2 million times as of early November 2019. Part 2 of the series won GRM Daily's Video of the Year award in 2018. The success of Shiro's Story led to Rapman signing a contract with Island Records and Jay-Z's Roc Nation.

Blue Story
In 2019, Rapman made his feature-length film debut by writing, directing and narrating Blue Story, a film adaptation of his YouTube series of the same name. The film, told through the medium of rap, starred Stephen Odubola, Micheal Ward, Eric Kofi-Abrefa, Khali Best, Karla-Simone Spence, Richie Campbell, Jo Martin and Junior Afolabi Salokun.

Despite the Vue Cinemas chain cancelling all screenings of the film following a machete incident in Birmingham, Blue Story received critical acclaim and grossed £4.7 million on a budget of £1.4 million, surpassing Noel Clarke's crime film Brotherhood to become the highest grossing British urban film of all time.

The film won the BAFTA Rising Star for Ward at the 73rd British Academy Film Awards and was short-listed alongside nine other films by the British Academy of Film and Television Arts for the category of the BAFTA Award for Outstanding Debut by a British Writer, Director or Producer but did not make it in the final nominations. At the 2020 NME Awards the film won two awards for Best Film and Best Film Actor for Ward.

TV career

Supacell
In 2022, it was announced that Rapman would serve as showrunner, creator, writer and lead director on Supacell for Netflix, a superhero series about a group of seemingly ordinary black people from South London who unexpectedly develop super powers.

Influences
Rapman cites Tupac Shakur, the Notorious B.I.G., Nas and Jay-Z as an influence on his rap storytelling, claiming that "all of their albums had a storytelling song on it. The storytelling song was always my favourite song, but they never used to do the visuals to it! So, when I started rapping, I wanted to rap like them but take the visuals to another level".

In regard to his filmmaking, Rapman cites Martin Scorsese as a source of inspiration, with his favourite film being GoodFellas. Some of his other film influences include Ryan Coogler, F. Gary Gray, the Hughes Brothers, John Singleton and Spike Lee.

References

External links
 

English male rappers
Rappers from London
British record producers
Living people
British film directors
People from Deptford
Members of the Order of the British Empire
1984 births